Magdiwang, officially the Municipality of Magdiwang, is a 5th class municipality in the province of Romblon, Philippines. According to the 2020 census, it has a population of 15,385 people.

Formerly known as Naylog and Magallanes, it is one of three municipalities in Sibuyan Island, which has been dubbed as the "Galapagos of Asia" due to its pristine natural environment and high endemism rate for flora and fauna.

History

Early history

Based on civil and church records from 1820, Magdiwang was founded as Fundacion de Naylog, a settlement established in the northern coast of Sibuyan Island by religious missionaries led by Don Valentin Ayala. It was placed under the jurisdiction of Pueblo de Sibuyan, whose seat was located in Cajidiocan town. In 1855, the settlement was one of 17 new pueblos (towns) added to the four already existing in the province and was renamed Magallanes, in honor of Spanish explorer Ferdinand Magellan.

Six years later, on 21 February 1861, another pueblo, Rancheria de Infiel, was organized close to Magallanes, located in the upstream of the present poblacion in what is now Barangay Dulangan. This new pueblo was established for the sake of the relocated Mangyanes or May-as tribe, who used to live in the mountains, so that missionary works and Christianizing efforts conducted in the lowland villages will be extended to them as well. This pueblo was incorporated later on, during the American occupation, as part of Magdiwang.

Thirteen years later, on 11 January 1868, when Romblon was converted into a province, Magallanes was demoted to a missionary center from its former status as pueblo by the first governor of the Romblon, Don Joaquin Corillo.

Modern history

Civil government in Romblon was established under the Americans on 16 March 1901.  Magallanes was one of 11 new municipalities. In 1917, due to reorganization and the province's difficult financial status as a newly restored entity, the former municipality of Magallanes was abolished and annexed to Cajidiocan. It was only restored to its independent municipality status on 1 March 1933, with the new name Magdiwang, in honor of the Magdiwang faction of the Philippine revolutionary group, Katipunan. It was inaugurated through festivities which lasted from 24 to 25 March 1933 and led by Governor Manuel T. Alvero.

On 8 June 1940, the special municipality of Sibuyan was established through the passage of Commonwealth Act No. 581, sponsored by Congressman Leonardo Festin.  Magdiwang was abolished and was annexed to the new municipality with its seat at Cajidiocan town proper. The special municipality of Sibuyan was abolished through the passage of Republic Act No. 38, which was authored by Congressman Modesto Formelleza and took effect on 1 October 1946, when President Manuel Roxas signed the Republic Act no. 38, restoring Magdiwang as a municipality.

In February 2018, the government planned the construction of a road that would go through Mt. Guiting-guiting Natural Park Protected Area, effectively endangering thousands of Sibuyan Island pristine forests that have never been touched by man. An online campaign against the road construction was launched afterwards, urging the President, the Department of Environment and Natural Resources, the Department of Public Work and Highways, the Mt. Guiting-guiting Natural Park Protected Area Management Board, and the LGUs of Sibuyan Island to halt the highly-destructive 'development' project.

Geography

Magdiwang is one of three municipalities in Sibuyan Island, the second largest among the islands of Romblon. It is bound on the west by Cajidiocan, on the south by San Fernando, and on the north by Sibuyan Sea, and to the north-west by Romblon, Romblon. The total land area of Magdiwang is 100.75 km2. The town has the following soil classification: Tupi loam, Laylay sandy clay loam and Mogpog Farson Complex. Much of the terrain is hilly and mountainous and is covered by lush tropical rainforest, as it is part of the Mount Guiting-Guiting Natural Park.

Climate

Barangays
Magdiwang is politically subdivided into 9 barangays.

Demographics
According to the 2015 Philippine census, Magdiwang has a population of 14,142 people.  A variant of the Romblomanon language locally, called Sibuyanon, is the native language of the municipality's inhabitants.

Economy 

Magdiwang is an agricultural municipality with a small percentage of manufacturing and service-oriented activities. According to the Office of the Provincial Agriculturist, the municipality has the highest agricultural production in the province. Other potential economic activities include fish culture and processing, cut flower industries, cottage industries, garment manufacturing, banking, and tourism.

Utilities
Electricity in Magdiwang is provided by the Romblon Electric Cooperative. As for water supply, the town as 5 community irrigation projects that have service area of 188 hectares. Potable water is mostly supplied through jet pumps, artesian wells, deep wells, and springs. Cellular communication is made possible through companies like PLDT, Smart Communications, and Globe Telecom.

Infrastructure
Ambulong Port in Magdiwang is the port of entry to Sibuyan Island. There are weekly RORO and motorized boat trips to the municipality from Manila, Lucena, Quezon, and San Agustin, Romblon. The municipality is connected to its neighboring towns via the Sibuyan Circumferential Road. Public utility jeepneys (PUJ), pedicabs, tricycles, and motorcycles are the common form of public transportation in the area.

Tourism
Because of its preserved natural environment, Magdiwang is touted as a prime eco-tourism destination. The municipality is staging point of mountain climbers ascending Mount Guiting-Guiting, Romblon's tallest mountain. It also has several rivers, falls, and beaches, which tourists can enjoy.

Magdiwang Beach: Stretches over two kilometers on the western side of Magdiwang, facing the Sibuyan Sea.
Lambingan Falls: A romantic hideaway marked by huge boulders that deflect the cascade from the heights. The falls has a natural pool with cool surroundings, ideal for swimming and picnics. The park is complemented by other tourist potential that is constantly developed for town beautification because of its lush greenery.
Paseo de Magdiwang: A farm close to Magdiwang Beach and is home to a strand of agojo and pine trees that are older than the park.
Marine Garden: A repository of rich marine life that is a boon for scuba divers and explorer of the deep.

Government

Pursuant to Chapter II, Title II, Book III of Republic Act 7160 or the Local Government Code of 1991, the municipal government is composed of a mayor (alkalde), a vice mayor (bise alkalde) and members (kagawad) of the legislative branch Sangguniang Bayan alongside a secretary to the said legislature, all of which are elected to a three-year term and are eligible to run for three consecutive terms.

References

External links
Magdiwang Profile at PhilAtlas.com
Magdiwang Profile - Cities and Municipalities Competitive Index
[ Philippine Standard Geographic Code]
Philippine Census Information
"Magdiwang Profile" at the Local Governance Performance Management System

Municipalities of Romblon